Ruben Hoogenhout (born 14 April 1999) is a Dutch professional footballer who plays as a centre-back for Resovia, on loan from Miedź Legnica.

Club career
He made his professional debut in the Eerste Divisie for Jong FC Utrecht on 10 March 2017 in a game against Achilles '29.

On 5 November 2020, he joined Miedź Legnica II. Shortly after, he was promoted to the first team roster.

On 6 July 2022, Hoogenhout moved on loan to I liga club Resovia for one year.

Honours
Miedź Legnica
I liga: 2021–22

References

External links
 

1999 births
Living people
Dutch footballers
Dutch expatriate footballers
Netherlands youth international footballers
Jong FC Utrecht players
Miedź Legnica players
Resovia (football) players 
Eerste Divisie players
I liga players
III liga players
Association football defenders
Expatriate footballers in Poland
Dutch expatriate sportspeople in Poland